Zulkurnain bin Kamisan is a Malaysian politician. He is the Member of Johor State Legislative Assembly for Sri Medan since 2013 and served as Johor State Executive Councillor.

Election Results

References 

Malaysian people of Malay descent
Malaysian Muslims
United Malays National Organisation politicians
21st-century Malaysian politicians
Members of the Johor State Legislative Assembly
 Johor state executive councillors
People from Johor
Living people
Year of birth missing (living people)